The American Fork City Hall on Church Street in American Fork, Utah was built in 1903.  It was listed on the National Register of Historic Places in 1994.

See also

 National Register of Historic Places listings in Utah County, Utah

References

External links

Neoclassical architecture in Utah
Government buildings completed in 1903
City and town halls on the National Register of Historic Places in Utah
Romanesque Revival architecture in Utah
Buildings and structures in American Fork, Utah
National Register of Historic Places in Utah County, Utah
City and town halls in Utah
1903 establishments in Utah